Edward Thompson (ca. 1639 – 6 August 1701) was an English landowner and politician.

Edward and his brother Sir Henry Thompson were wine merchants of York; Edward became the principal mover of the business after his brother moved to his new estate at Escrick in 1668. He was a particular friend of Andrew Marvell. During the reign of Charles II, Edward bought the estate of Sheriff Hutton for his own country residence. He was Lord Mayor of York in 1683. He was three times Member of Parliament for York, beginning in 1689.

He married Frances Thompson and had two children: Leonard, who married his second cousin once removed, Frances Thompson of Escrick, and died without issue in 1744, and Richard (d. 1753), twice Lord Mayor of York.

References

1630s births
1701 deaths
Lord Mayors of York
English landowners
17th-century merchants
Wine merchants
English MPs 1689–1690
English MPs 1695–1698
English MPs 1701